The Northwest New Mexico Correctional Facility (NNMCF), formerly the New Mexico Women's Correctional Facility (NMWCF), is a privately owned prison for men, located in Grants, Cibola County, New Mexico.

The prison is owned and operated by the Corrections Corporation of America, under contract with the New Mexico Corrections Department.  It opened in 1989 as the first privatized women's prison in the U.S.  

In late 2015 state officials announced a plan to transfer all female inmates out of the facility, and to consolidate New Mexico's estimated population of 1200 sex offenders here. In August 2016 it was renamed as Northwest New Mexico Correctional Center.

References

External links
 Northwest New Mexico Correctional Facility
 

Prisons in New Mexico
Buildings and structures in Cibola County, New Mexico
CoreCivic
1989 establishments in New Mexico